Black Map (stylized as BL∀CK MAP) is an American post-hardcore supergroup based out of San Francisco, California. The trio consists of Ben Flanagan on bass and vocals, Chris Robyn on drums and Mark Engles on guitar. The band most recently has toured with Chevelle, Bush, and Circa Survive.

Black Map formed following a hiatus from the members' respective bands: Dredg (guitarist Mark Engles), Far (drummer Chris Robyn), and The Trophy Fire (vocalist/guitarist Ben Flanagan). The band's first release was a four-song EP, titled Driver, released in February 2014. On October 27, 2014, the band's debut LP, ...And We Explode, was released through Minus Head Records. Their second full-length album, In Droves, was released on March 10, 2017.  through their current label EOne. On February 9th 2018 Black Map released a four-song EP, titled Trace the Path.

Discography

EPs 
 Driver (2014)
 Trace The Path (2018)

Studio albums 
 ...And We Explode (2014)
 In Droves (2017)
 Melodoria (2022)

Singles 
 Run Rabbit Run (2017) #31 US  Mainstream  Rock Songs

References

External links 
 Official Website

Alternative rock groups from California
Rock music groups from California
Post-hardcore groups
Long Branch Records artists
Musical groups from the San Francisco Bay Area
Musical groups established in 2012
2012 establishments in California
Rock music supergroups